The Dark Keys is a jazz trio album by the Branford Marsalis Trio, featuring Branford Marsalis, Reginald Veal, and Jeff "Tain" Watts, with guest appearances from Kenny Garrett and Joe Lovano. Recorded July 31 to August 2, 1996, in the Tarrytown Music Hall in Tarrytown, New York, the album reached Number 9 on the Billboard Top Jazz Albums chart.

Reception
In his AllMusic review, Leo Stanley wrote that the performance "pushes at the borders of post-bop, adding elements of hip-hop and rock & roll, making for an adventurous and exciting listen." Steve Futterman concurred in his Entertainment Weekly review, noting that the album shows Marsalis returning "to contender status." Writing in 2009 in The New York Times, Ben Ratliff called the album one of the landmarks of the saxophone trio album tradition over the last 50 years.

Track listing

Personnel
 Branford Marsalis – Saxophones
 Reginald Veal, bass
 Jeff "Tain" Watts, drums
 Kenny Garrett, alto saxophone (on "Judas Iscariot")
 Joe Lovano, tenor saxophone (on "Sentinel")

References

External links
 BranfordMarsalis.com 

1996 albums
Branford Marsalis albums